Sarah Papp ( Hoolt, born 30 April 1988) is a German chess player who holds the FIDE title of Woman Grandmaster. She married Hungarian Grandmaster  in September 2019.

Chess career
From 2001 to 2006, Hoolt participated in German Girls' Championships and won this tournament in 2006 (age category U18). From 2004 to 2008 she participated in European Youth Chess Championships and World Youth Chess Championships. In 2011 in Bonn Sarah Hoolt won German Women's Championship.

She played for Germany in Women's Chess Olympiads:
 In 2008, at reserve board in the 38th Chess Olympiad (women) in Dresden (+0, =2, -3),
 In 2010, at second board in the 39th Chess Olympiad (women) in Khanty-Mansiysk (+1, =4, -3),
 In 2014, at reserve board in the 41st Chess Olympiad (women) in Tromsø (+6, =2, -2).

Hoolt played for Germany in European Team Chess Championship:
 In 2011, at reserve board in the 9th European Team Chess Championship (women) in Porto Carras (+2, =0, -5).

She received the Woman International Master (WIM) title in 2008 and the Woman Grandmaster (WGM) title in September 2012.

FIDE ratings

References

External links
 
 
 

1988 births
Living people
German female chess players
Chess woman grandmasters
Chess Olympiad competitors
People from Nordhorn